Crimean chamber (in transliterated form "Krymska svitlytsia") is the only national Ukrainian newspaper in Crimea. It is published since 31 December 1992.

Its profile changed more than once during its existence, sometimes covering mostly social and political topics, sometimes becoming more literary and historical in its content, but always focusing on Crimean themes.

Since 2006 the "Crimean chamber" editorial works as a part of the state-owned enterprise (SE) "National newspaper and magazine publishing".

As a result of the Russian occupation of Crimea in March 2014, the publisher had to stop the printed version of newspaper since February 2015, so that for over a year the newspaper existed only in electronic format. However, by an order of the publisher's board of directors in May 2016 the newspaper's editorial got evacuated from the occupied peninsula to Kyiv, and after a forced break, since July 2016 the publishing of the printed version of "Crimean chamber" resumed in Kyiv.

The entire editorial staff of the newspaper "Crimean chamber" are people from Crimea.

Since 2017 is published under CC-BY 3.0 license.

References

External links

  
 Facebook page

1992 establishments in Ukraine
Publications established in 1992
Weekly newspapers published in Ukraine
Ukrainian-language newspapers
Mass media in Kyiv